Alberta separatism comprises a series of 20th- and 21st-century movements (both historic and current) advocating the secession of the province of Alberta from Canada, either by joining the United States, forming an independent nation or by creating a new union with one or more of Canada's western provinces. The main issues driving separatist sentiment have been the perceived power disparity relative to Ottawa and other provinces, historical grievances with the federal government dating back to the unrealized Province of Buffalo, a sense of distinctiveness with regards to Alberta's unique cultural and political identity, and Canadian fiscal policy, particularly as it pertains to the energy industry.

History

Foundations
Alberta was established as a province on September 1, 1905. Alberta separatism comes from the belief that many Albertans hold that they are culturally and economically distinct from the rest of Canada, particularly Central Canada and Eastern Canada, because of economic imbalances whereby Alberta is a net over-contributor to the system of equalization payments in Canada. Furthermore, the majority of Alberta's trade flows north–south with the United States and not east–west with the rest of Canada.

The Alberta economy was traditionally based on agriculture, but in the last half of the 20th century it changed to become based on industrial resource extraction, mainly oil and gas production. Because many of Alberta's early pioneers that came to settle the land were from the United States, Alberta experiences levels of populism unheard of in Toronto and Montreal.

1930s separatism and the Alberta Social Credit Party

 

Separatism emerged in the 1930s within the Social Credit Party, which formed the Government of Alberta after the 1935 election. William Aberhart and Ernest Manning created the Social Credit party with the aim of bringing financial relief to Albertans who were suffering because of the Great Depression. The party's success was fuelled by a wave of resentment at the federal Liberal Prime Minister William Lyon Mackenzie King, who had said that he "would not give a five-cent piece" to non-Liberal provincial governments for unemployment relief. The federal government deemed implementing a form of social credit unconstitutional and invoked its rarely used power of disallowance under S.56 of the British North America Act, 1867, thereby voiding provincial legislation. Premier Aberhart secured provincially-owned banks and distribution of prosperity certificates. Aberhart's followers called for separation from Canada, but Aberhart himself counselled moderation and rejected secession. The separatist movement was ridiculed by the media as a fringe movement of the uneducated. Manning, however, had been a devoutly loyal supporter of Aberhart from the very beginning. He honoured Aberhart's 1935 promise to issue a prosperity certificate to Albertans twice. In 1957, his government announced a $20 oil royalty dividend and issued a $17 dividend the next year.

1940s to 1960s: after World War II, monopolies, Alberta gas

The discovery of vast reserves of oil ushered in a twenty-year period of intense exploration, new discoveries, and rapid expansion of Alberta's oil industry. In 1948, Imperial Oil discovered the Redwater oil reserve, 64 km (40 mi.) northeast of Edmonton. By 1953 the oil field supported 926 wells and was producing almost 30 percent of the entire province's output. In 1949 alone Twelve new oil fields were discovered from the Leduc-Edmonton-Redwater region to the southern Alberta and the extreme northwest Alberta. Many of the fields were found by Imperial Oil, but other major oil companies, such as British-American oil, Gulf, Anglo-Canadian, and Home Oil, also experienced incredible success. But Alberta was still was "heavily rural and bitter with western grievance. Freight rates and protectionism made economic diversification in the prairies all but impossible. It was said to be cheaper to send cows and grain to be slaughtered in Ontario than it was to ship meat."

1970s: beginnings of modern separatist ideals
The modern ideal for a separate Alberta nation began in the 1970s, as a response to Prime Minister Pierre Trudeau's pursuit of bilingualism and Multiculturalism in Canada, and the National Energy Program. These programs were seen by many Albertans as an attack on oil resources; the promotion of Liberal "anti-Albertan" values were viewed as a negative influence by many Albertans.

In 1974, as Quebeckers were discussing separating from Canada, many Albertans also began to consider separation. This resulted in some Calgary-based citizens forming the Independent Alberta Association. Central to the argument was the fact that Alberta would pay billions of dollars towards Canada, but without political representation equal to that of Central and Eastern Canada. Many expressed the opinion that Trudeau would continue his hard federalist stance producing unfavorable results for Western Canada including Alberta and its natural resources. Some, like Glenn Morrison, president of Renn Industries, did not agree with Alberta separatism but believed strongly that Alberta needed increased representation in Ottawa and greater provincial autonomy. In the end, the Independent Alberta Association did not move beyond association status, and did not form a political party.

Other influences in the 1970s included two major oil crises: coinciding with the Yom-Kippur War of 1973 and the Iranian Revolution of 1979. The first was caused by the decision of the US to support Israel, which in turn caused retaliation by Egypt and Syria, bringing on an oil embargo that resulted in Alberta receiving substantially less price for oil than the global market prices dictated. Across North America, long lines could be seen at gas stations, and people started to realize the need to conserve energy resources.

The second oil crisis of 1979 was again due to decreased oil output, this time in the wake of the Iranian Revolution.
In 1978, a revolutionary anti-American government headed by the Ayatollah Ruhollah Khomeini overthrew the America-friendly government of the Shah of Iran. Gasoline prices, which had earlier stabilized somewhat since 1973, spiked again. Some members of the Organization of Petroleum Exporting Countries (OPEC) and a few similarly minded oil-rich nations had ceased all oil exports to the United States and countries that supported Israel. The price of oil sold to North America quadrupled within months, and service stations again ran out of fuel, long lines were evident at gas stations across North America.

The Alberta government and the Canadian federal government responded politically to address oil reserves and conservation of petroleum resources. In 1971, the Alberta Social Credit Party provincial government, headed by Harry Strom, created an environmental ministry, the first of its kind, with a mandate to manage and conserve Alberta's natural resources. Federally, in 1974, the Office of Energy Conservation was created. Conflict arose between Alberta and Canada after the 1973 crisis, over the management and distribution of Alberta's oil resources, and financial wealth, setting the stage for Alberta separatism.

After Joe Clark's Progressive Conservatives won a minority government in 1979 defeating Pierre Trudeau's Liberal party Albertans were hopeful a change in federal energy policy would occur. These ideas were harnessed during Clark's unsuccessful 1980 election campaign. Clark, an Albertan, lost the election and resigned the leadership of the Progressive Conservative Party in 1983 after receiving only a 67% confidence vote at a party convention.

1980s and 1990s: Liberals, NDP, Conservatives, resurgence
Copied content from National Energy Program; see that page's history for attribution.

In 1980, a Liberal majority government under Pierre Trudeau was formed. This caused the already-brewing separatist movement in western Canada to attract thousands of people to rallies. Separatist Gordon Kesler was elected to the Alberta legislature in a 1982 by-election. 

Due to the high oil prices of the 1970s Alberta experienced a boom in its oil sector and the entire economy as a whole. In October 1980, the National Energy Program (NEP) was created by the federal government under Prime Minister Trudeau, and support for Alberta separatism and anger toward the federal government reached new level of popular support. Trudeau introduced a 25% tax to Alberta's oil. After the introduction of the NEP, Alberta's oil industry collapsed, with a drastic reduction in the number of oil wells drilled. Abandonment of major projects such as oilsands caused high unemployment in Alberta. The Petroleum Incentives Program, part of the NEP, was criticized for luring exploration capital away from Alberta. With natural resources falling constitutionally within the domain of provincial jurisdictions, many Albertans viewed the NEP as a detrimental intrusion by the federal government into the province's affairs. Edmonton economist Scarfe argued that for people in Western Canada, especially Alberta, the NEP was perceived to be at their expense in benefiting the eastern provinces. Particularly vilified was Prime Minister Pierre Trudeau, whose Liberals had no seat west of Manitoba. Ed Clark, a senior bureaucrat in the Trudeau Liberal government, helped to develop the National Energy Program and earned himself the moniker "Red Ed" in the Alberta oil industry. Shortly after Brian Mulroney had taken office, Clark was promptly fired.

The 1980s oil glut led worldwide oil prices to tank, making Albertan oil uneconomical even in Eastern Canada, causing it to instead purchase foreign oil. This discredited the NEP – as "self-sufficiency" was one of its touted goals. Even though the NEP was often seen as an economic catastrophe, the NEP was never overturned by Trudeau's government, staying in place until 1985.

Alberta still initially enjoyed an economic surplus due to high oil prices, but the surplus was heavily reduced by the NEP, which, in turn, stymied many of Lougheed's policies for economic diversification to reduce Alberta's dependence on the cyclical energy industry, such as the Alberta Heritage Savings Trust Fund, and also left the province with an infrastructure deficit. In particular, the Alberta Heritage Fund was meant to save as much of the earnings during high oil prices to act as a "rainy day" cushion if oil prices collapsed because of the cyclical nature of the oil and gas industry. The NEP was one reason that the fund failed to grow to its full potential. According to Mary Elizabeth Vicente, an Edmonton librarian who wrote an article on the National Energy Program in 2005, the popular western slogan during the NEP, appearing on many bumper stickers, was "Let the Eastern bastards freeze in the dark." Other bumpers stated "I'd rather push this thing a mile than buy gas from PetroCan."

So great was the hatred towards Trudeau that anything associated with him was destroyed in the province. The Alberta Liberal Party lost thousands of members, and won no seats in the provincial legislature in the 1982 Alberta general election. This led to a center-right-controlled legislature for decades. The Alberta Liberals never held any sizable legislative power again. Many prominent citizens were inspired to push forward Alberta separatist principles. This sentiment gave rise to the Western Canada Concept (WCC) and West-Fed which held well-attended meetings across Alberta. Many of the people attracted to these parties were not necessarily advocating for independence but were advocating for the fair treatment of Alberta and its resources.

In 1980, Doug Christie, a British Columbia lawyer, formed the WCC in an effort to promote Western separatism. In 1980 2700 people gathered for a rally at the Jubilee Auditorium in Edmonton, to listen to a speech from Christie. in which he said "[The Liberals] are begging Quebec: 'Please vote for us!' No more begging,". In 1982, Gordon Kesler was elected to the Alberta legislature in a by-election in Olds-Didsbury as a candidate of the WCC and attracted national attention.

In addition, West-Fed was founded, led by Edmonton businessman Elmer Knutson, who was credited with inspiring the transformation of Western alienation ideas into a political movement. Knutson denied being a separatist, but West-Fed was widely regarded as a separatist organization. In 1983, Knutson attempted but failed, to win the leadership of the Social Credit Party of Canada. A year later in 1984, Knutson founded the Confederation of Regions Party to advocate for a new Canadian constitution that would provide Alberta with more regional autonomy. The Confederation of Regions Party of Canada (CoR) was based on the premise that Canada consists of four regions, each of which should have equal representation in Parliament. By mid-1983 it was registered as an official provincial party in Alberta and by 1984 it was registered federally and ran 54 candidates but none were elected. Major platform initiatives included opposition to compulsory bilingualism and metrication, abolishing the Senate, and equal representation to the four regions. A year later Knutson resigned, but in all had significantly inspired many Albertans to join Doug Christie's Western Canada Concept, which was running candidates in elections.

Before 1980, separatism was a very fringe idea; for example, a 1977 survey by the Calgary Herald found that 2.7 per cent supported independence. Support for separatism spiked sharply after Pierre Trudeau became prime minister; in a 1981 poll by the Canada West Foundation, 49% agreed that "Western Canadians get so few benefits from being part of Canada that they might as well go it on their own."

In response, Premier Peter Lougheed called a snap election in which the party nominated 78 candidates in the province's 79 ridings (electoral districts). Highlighted was major infighting and structural leadership problems within the WCC.

Although WCC won almost 12% of the popular vote (over 111,000 votes), Kesler was defeated after changing ridings, and no other candidate was elected. The WCC still managed a strong third-place showing in another by-election, in Spirit River-Fairview, held in 1985, following the death of Grant Notley.

The party's popularity declined after the Progressive Conservative Party, led by Brian Mulroney won a majority government, defeating Prime Minister John Turner in the 1984 federal election. Under Mulroney, the NEP was rapidly dismantled, and Albertans had new hope for achieving a better-negotiated resource wealth distribution. This caused the Alberta separatist movement to dissipate significantly. Yet, the Mulroney government was a disappointment since the majority of MPs were elected from central Canada, and Alberta's concerns largely ignored. By the time he left office in 1993, Mulroney was perhaps the most hated prime minister due to various allegations of corruption pertaining to the sale of Canadian assets. Mulroney awarded the contract for maintenance of CF-18 fighter jets to the Montreal-based Bombardier Aerospace company, a decision that engendered so much anger in Western Canada, since Western Canada produced a better bid, that it directly led to the formation of the Reform Party of Alberta.

After this, the WCC experienced a resurgence, and in 1987 ran candidate Jack Ramsay, who in 1982 had become the leader of the party. Ramsay notably and significantly argued for the Triple-E Senate as an alternative to Alberta separation, until 1986 when he reverted his opinion back to the previous separatist position of the WCC. In 1987 Ramsay joined the Reform Party of Alberta and ran in a by-election where he finished second. This would be the last time the party would run a candidate.

Alberta prominent citizen Preston Manning would take the Reform Party of Canada, a right-wing populist federal party, along the lines of non-separatist sentiments and significant popularity. Manning would attract many Albertans that were separatists. The Reform Party existed from 1987 to 2000 when it merged into the Canadian Alliance. In 2003, it merged with the Progressive Conservative Party to form the modern-day Conservative Party of Canada. These mergers left a void to those interested in furthering separatist principles.

2000s Reform to Conservative
Without the existence of the Reform Party to articulate Alberta's concerns, the separatist movement in the early twenty-first century began to organize meaningfully for the first time since the 1980s. Again though, separatism would place faith in a favourable federal government, only to again be disappointed.

In the 2004 federal election, the governing Liberal Party of Canada was returned with a minority government despite allegations of corruption. 61.7% of Alberta voters voted for the opposition Conservative Party – 22% supported the Liberals, although how many of these Conservative voters were separatist can only be guessed.

There was significant opposition within Alberta to the Kyoto Protocol as the Kyoto treaty was believed to have negative effects on the provincial economy, which is based to a large degree on the oil and gas industry. (Alberta had the world's second largest proven reserves of oil, behind only Saudi Arabia.)

In the 2004 general election, the Separation Party of Alberta nominated 12 candidates who won 4,680 votes, 0.5% of the provincial total. No candidates were elected. This was less support than the Alberta Independence Party attracted in the 2001 election, when 15 candidates attracted 7,500 votes.

Albertan Stephen Harper succeeded against the odds of the Canadian First-past-the-post voting system and in 2006 became Prime Minister of Canada in a minority government in the 2006 federal election. Harper had been a significant figure in the Reform Party, became leader of the Canadian Alliance in 2002, then merged with the PC Party in 2003, forming the Conservative Party of Canada. Due to Harper's Reform roots, Albertans held faith that he would be the trusted figure to protect Alberta's interests. As a result, Alberta's separatist movement sat on the side-lines, with uncertain prospects. Some pundits predicted that this result would cause support for separatism to ebb away.

The notion of Alberta secession from Canada gained sympathy from some figures within Alberta's conservative parties. Mark Norris, who was one of the contenders to succeed Ralph Klein as the Alberta premier, told the Calgary Sun in March 2006 that under his leadership, if a future federal government persisted in bringing in policies harmful to Alberta such as a carbon tax, "(Alberta is) going to take steps to secede."

Also, some politicians believe, and at least one poll indicated that a much larger portion of the Alberta population may be at least sympathetic to the notion of secession than was indicated by election results. In January 2004, Premier Ralph Klein told the Canadian edition of Reader's Digest that one in four Albertans were in support of separation. An August 2005 poll commissioned by the Western Standard pegged support for the idea that "Western Canadians should begin to explore the idea of forming their own country." at 42% in Alberta and 35.6% across the four Western provinces

Late 2010s to early 2020s resurgence

Support for Albertan separatism has increased significantly with the Canadian federal election victory of Justin Trudeau's Liberal Party on October 19, 2015. Trudeau, the son of Pierre Trudeau, became prime minister with a majority government, and re-inspired the Alberta separatist movement. While speaking at a town hall in Peterborough, Ontario, on January 13, 2017, Trudeau said, "We can't shut down the oilsands tomorrow. We need to phase them out. We need to manage the transition off of our dependence on fossil fuels. That is going to take time," The next day at a Calgary vs Edmonton hockey game in Edmonton, Mr. Trudeau was loudly booed by the crowd. His unpopularity in Alberta is a significant rallying point for Alberta separatists. The topic of Alberta separating from Canada is the subject of a number mainstream media reports.

The geopolitical analyst Peter Zeihan in his 2014 book The Accidental Superpower presented the reasons why he believed both Alberta and the U.S. would benefit from Alberta joining the United States as the 51st state. Quote from page 263 of book:

The core issue is pretty simple. While the Québécois—and to a slightly lesser degree the rest of Canada—now need Alberta to maintain their standard of living, the Albertans now need not to be a part of Canada in order to maintain theirs.

Zeihan also stated that "Right now, every man, woman and child in Alberta pays $6,000 more into the national budget than they get back. Alberta is the only province that is a net contributor to that budget — by 2020, the number will exceed $20,000 per person, $40,000 per taxpayer. That will be the greatest wealth transfer in per capita terms in the Western world." Per Statistics Canada, in 2015 Alberta paid $27 billion more into the federal treasury than it received back in services. And that "Anywhere else in the world, this would be a secessionist crisis... There is no other place in the world where you have one province that is lightly populated but very rich, that doesn't have a certain degree of rebellion. The redistribution system that Canada has with the transfer payments, anywhere else would have social instability. But to be blunt, Canadians are just too damn polite."

A September 2018 poll by Ipsos indicated that 62% of Albertans believe that Alberta "does not get its fair share from Confederation" (up from 45% in 1997), 46% feel "more attached to their province than to their country" (up from 39% in 1997), 34% "feel less committed to Canada than I did a few years ago" (up from 22% in 1997), 18% believe "the views of western Canadians are adequately represented in Ottawa" (down from 22% in 2001), and 25% believe "My province would be better off if it separated from Canada" (up from 19% in 2001).

A February 2019 poll from Angus Reid found 50% of Albertans would support secession from Canada but also found the likelihood that Alberta would separate to be "remote."

After Justin Trudeau's re-election on October 21, 2019, in the Canadian federal election, #Wexit (a wordplay on "Brexit", the United Kingdom's departure from the European Union) trended on social media. However, experts and an analysis from Hill+Knowlton Strategies, demonstrated that part of the push was due to disinformation and bots. On November 4, 2019, the separation group "Wexit Alberta" applied for federal political party status. On November 6, 2019, a poll conducted by Ipsos show a historic high of interest of secession from Canada in both Alberta and Saskatchewan provinces by 33% and 27%, respectively. On January 12, 2020, Wexit Canada was granted eligibility for the next federal election.

A May 2020 poll by Northwest Research for the Western Standard found that 41% of respondents would support independence in a referendum, 50% would be opposed, and 9% weren't sure. Removing undecideds, 45% would support and 55% would be opposed. Respondents were also asked if they would support a referendum if "the federal government is unwilling to negotiate with Alberta on a new constitutional arrangement", 48% said yes, while 52% said no. Support for independence was higher outside of Alberta's two biggest cities, with Edmonton being the most opposed.

Legality of separation in Canada 

In Canada the Clarity Act, which has been approved by the Supreme Court of Canada, governs the process a province should follow to achieve separation. The first step is a province-wide referendum with a clear question. The size of majority support required by referendum is not defined.

Political parties interested in separation

Registered Alberta political parties
Independence Party of Alberta
Wildrose Independence Party of Alberta (formed through a merger of the Freedom Conservative Party of Alberta and Wexit Alberta)

Registered federal political parties
Maverick Party

Opinion polling

See also

Athabasca oil sands
Annexation movements of Canada
Cascadia (independence movement)
List of political parties in Alberta
Politics of Alberta
Quebec sovereignty movement
Secessionist movements of Canada
Western alienation
Western Canada Concept

References

Further reading
 Bell, Edward. "Separatism and Quasi-Separatism in Alberta", Prairie Forum, Sep 2007, Vol. 32, Issue 2, pp. 335–355
 Pratt, Larry, and Garth Stevenson. Western separatism: the myths, realities & dangers (1981)
 Wagner, Michael. Alberta: Separatism Then and Now (St. Catharines, ON: Freedom Press Canada Inc., 2009) 138 pp, favourable account that concludes, "The odds of Alberta actually leaving Confederation are remote, at this point." However, he adds, "in my view, separatism has a future."
 Zeihan, Peter (2014). The Accidental Superpower: The Next Generation of American Preeminence and the Coming Global Disorder. (Chapter devoted to Alberta separatism)

Politics of Alberta
Separatism in Canada
Politics of Western Canada